Olympique Thonon Chablais, known as Club Sportif de Thonon until 1987, was a football club based in Thonon-les-Bains, France. Founded in 1909, the club's colours were yellow and blue. The team played its home matches at the Stade Joseph-Moynat.

From 1979 to 1987, Thonon played in the Division 2. In 2007, the club merged with Football Croix-de-Savoie 74 to form Olympique Croix-de-Savoie 74.

Name changes 

 1909–1987: Club Sportif de Thonon
 1987–1992: Olympique Thonon-les-Bains
 1992–1997: Thonon Chablais Football (merged with Stella Thonon)
 1997–2007: Olympique Thonon Chablais

Honours

References 

 
Olympique Thonon Chablais
Association football clubs established in 1909
1909 establishments in France
Association football clubs disestablished in 2007
2007 disestablishments in France
Defunct football clubs in France
Sport in Haute-Savoie
Football clubs in Auvergne-Rhône-Alpes